Ansoo Lake (which literally translates to teardrop lake), is a tear-shaped lake located in Kaghan Valley in Mansehra District of Khyber Pakhtunkhwa the province of Pakistan. The lake is situated near Malika Parbat, the highest mountain in Kaghan Valley. The name of the lake owes to its teardrop shape; the Urdu word ansoo means "teardrop". The lake is said to have been discovered in 1993 by Pakistan Air Force pilots who were flying at a relatively low altitude over the area.

See also
List of lakes in Pakistan
Pyala Lake
Saiful Muluk

References

External links
 Routes to Ansoo Lake

Lakes of Khyber Pakhtunkhwa
Mansehra District
Articles containing video clips